The vernacular name common scops owl may refer to any of three species in the scops-owl genus Otus. They were formerly considered conspecific and are allopatric, meaning that only one species is found in any given place.

 In Europe and western Asia, the Eurasian scops owl (Otus scops)
 In southern Asia, the Oriental scops owl (Otus sunia)
 In Africa, the African scops owl (Otus senegalensis)